Miroslava Chávez-García is a professor of history at the University of California, Santa Barbara. She holds joint appointments in the Departments of Chicana/o Studies and Feminist Studies. Chávez-García's research focuses on Chicana/o history, eugenics, gender, and juvenile justice. Chávez-García has authored three books: Negotiating Conquest (Tucson, 2004), States of Delinquency (Berkeley, 2012), and Migrant Longing (Chapel Hill, 2018). Her second work, States of Delinquency, was considered a groundbreaking text, describing California's eugenic program, which targeted young Mexican American and African American boys for irreversible sterilizations.

Chávez-García was born in Mexicali, Baja California, Mexico to farm worker parents. They moved to San Jose, California when she was an infant. She graduated from Notre Dame High School in 1986 and then received her B.A. (1991), M.A. (1993), and Ph.D. (1998), from the University of California, Los Angeles.

Selected works
Books

 Migrant Longing: Letter Writing Across the U.S.-Mexico Borderlands (Chapel Hill: University of North Carolina Press, 2018).
 States of Delinquency: Race and Science in the Making of California’s Juvenile Justice System (Berkeley: University of California Press, 2012).
 Negotiating Conquest: Gender and Power in California, 1770s to the 1880s (Tucson: University of Arizona Press, 2004).

References

21st-century American historians
American writers of Mexican descent
University of California, Los Angeles alumni
University of California, Santa Barbara faculty
Historians of the United States
Living people
American women historians
21st-century American women writers
American academics of Mexican descent
Year of birth missing (living people)